Jeffrey Weaver could refer to: 

Jeff Weaver (born 1976), American baseball player
Jeffrey P. Weaver (born 1966), American political operative and campaign manager for the 2016 Bernie Sanders presidential campaign
Jeffrey C. Weaver, historian of the American Civil War